The Empire Life Insurance in America Building is a historic commercial building at 2801 West Roosevelt Road in Little Rock, Arkansas.  It was built in 1959–60 to a design by the Little Rock firm of Wittenberg, Delony, and Davidson, and is a significant local example of the International style of commercial design.  It is a two-story structure of steel and concrete, predominantly faced in glass, aluminum, and fieldstone.  The building was given an award by the regional branch of the American Institute of Architects in 1961.

The building was listed on the National Register of Historic Places in 2019.

See also
National Register of Historic Places listings in Little Rock, Arkansas

References

Commercial buildings on the National Register of Historic Places in Arkansas
Buildings and structures in Little Rock, Arkansas
National Register of Historic Places in Little Rock, Arkansas
Historic district contributing properties in Arkansas
Commercial buildings completed in 1960